Katrina Jane "Trena" King (born January 17, 1958, in Kingwood, West Virginia) is an American archer.

Archery

She finished seventh at the 1984 Summer Olympic Games in the women's individual event with 2508 points.

King won a silver medal at the 1987 Pan American Games in the women's individual event.

References

External links 
 Profile on worldarchery.org

1958 births
Living people
American female archers
Olympic archers of the United States
Archers at the 1984 Summer Olympics
Pan American Games medalists in archery
Pan American Games silver medalists for the United States
Archers at the 1987 Pan American Games
People from Kingwood, West Virginia
Medalists at the 1987 Pan American Games
21st-century American women